Chrysus is the daimon of gold in Greek mythology.

Chrysus may also refer to:

 Körös, a river in Hungary and Romania known as Chrysus in antiquity
 Dobromir Chrysus or Dobromir Chrysos (13th century), leader of the Vlachs and Bulgarian Slavs

See Also 
 Halichoeres chrysus, a fish native to central Indo-Pacific area
 Sarota chrysus, a butterfly of the Amazon River basin and the Andes
 Chrysis (disambiguation)
 Chryses (mythology)